Walter Campos (born 4 April 1951) is a Costa Rican boxer. He competed in the men's light middleweight event at the 1968 Summer Olympics.

References

1951 births
Living people
Light-middleweight boxers
Costa Rican male boxers
Olympic boxers of Costa Rica
Boxers at the 1968 Summer Olympics
Sportspeople from San José, Costa Rica